Wasted Sky is the fourth studio album by Numb, released on June 15, 1994 by KK Records. The band changed musical direction by dampening processing and effects with the intention of exploring a different emotional intensity with their music. The album was reissued by Metropolis Records in July 1995.

Reception
A critic at Sonic Boom called Wasted Sky an impressive album that "intelligently uses guitars to accentuate the music."

Track listing

Personnel
Adapted from the Wasted Sky liner notes.

Numb
 Don Gordon – instruments, production
 Conan Hunter – lead vocals, instruments, production

Production and design
 Bie Aem Dee – cover art, design
 Fitz – photography
 Brian Gardner – mastering
 Peter Hoste – cover art, design
 Ken Marshall – production

Release history

References

External links 
 Wasted Sky at Bandcamp
 

1994 albums
Numb (band) albums
Metropolis Records albums